Camp Clinton was a World War II prisoner of war facility located in Clinton, Mississippi, just off present-day McRaven Road, east of Springridge Road. Camp Clinton was home to 3,000 German and Italian POWs, most of whom had been captured in Africa and were members of the Afrika Korps.

The prisoners at Camp Clinton provided labor to build the Mississippi River Basin Model, a one-square-mile working replica model of the Mississippi River and its tributaries, which the United States Army Corps of Engineers used for planning flood control projects.

Camp Clinton also housed several dozen German generals and admirals, including Afrika Korps commander Hans-Jürgen von Arnim, Wehrmacht general Ferdinand Neuling, and Dietrich von Choltitz, the last wartime Governor of Paris, who surrendered to the Free French.

References

Buildings and structures in Hinds County, Mississippi
Defunct prisons in Mississippi
History of Mississippi
Military installations in Mississippi
World War II prisoner of war camps in the United States